Pim van Vugt (born 25 January 1995 in Vlaardingen) is a sailor from the Netherlands.

By finishing on the 8th place at the 2019 49er & 49er FX World Championships on December 8, 2019 in Auckland, together with his partner Bart Lambriex he grabbed one of the four available international qualification spots for the 2020 Summer Olympics. On October 4, 2020 by finishing on the 6th place at the 2020 49er & 49er FX & Nacra17 European Championships in Lake Attersee in Austria, he also met the full national standards for qualifying for the above.

Sailing results

Olympic Games 
6th 2021 Tokyo - 49er class - With Bart Lambriex

World Championships
 2018 RS500 Weymouth (GBR) - Helmsmen (with sister Lisa van Vugt)
 2016 RS500 Travemunde (GER) - Helmsmen (with sister Lisa van Vugt)
8th 2019 49er Auckland (NZL) - Crew (with Bart Lambriex)
11th 2020 49er Geelong (AUS) - Crew (with Bart Lambriex)

European Championships
 2022 Javelin Workum - Helmsmen (with Wouter Stiphout)
6th 2020 49er - European Championship Attersee

National Championships 
 2022 Solo class - Loosdrecht
 2022 Solo class Sprint - Gouda
 2021 Solo class Sneek
 2021 National Sailing Leagues J70 Muiden - Trim (with Sven Coster, Ivo Polderman & Mees de Graaf)
 2021 SB20 class Medemblik - foredeck/trim (with Jasper ten Berge & Simon Anink)
 2021 Javelin class Heeg - Helmsmen (with sister Lisa van Vugt)
 2020 RS500 Bruinisse - Helmsmen (with sister Lisa van Vugt)
 2019 RS500 Bruinisse - Helmsmen (with sister Lisa van Vugt)
 2019 49er Medemblik - Crew (with Bart Lambriex)
 2018 49er Medemblik - Helmsmen (with Bart Lambriex)
 2018 Solo class Braassemermeer
 2017 British Nationals RS100 Netley/Southampton
 2017 49er Medemblik - Helmsmen(with Lars van Stekelenborg)
 2016 49erFX Medemblik - Crew (with Bart Lambriex)

Others
 2021 49er - World Cup Allianz Regatta Medemblik
 2016 - RedBull Foiling Generation

References

Living people
1995 births
People from Vlaardingen
Dutch male sailors (sport)
49er class sailors
Sailors at the 2020 Summer Olympics – 49er
Sportspeople from South Holland